Tuberculina is a genus of fungi in the family Helicobasidiaceae.

Species

Tuberculina africana
Tuberculina akatii
Tuberculina ampelophila
Tuberculina andina
Tuberculina apiculata
Tuberculina arechavaletae
Tuberculina argillacea
Tuberculina costaricana
Tuberculina davisiana
Tuberculina dorsteniae
Tuberculina flavogranulata
Tuberculina fusicina
Tuberculina guaranitica
Tuberculina hyalospora
Tuberculina jaffueli
Tuberculina japonica
Tuberculina jonesii
Tuberculina malvacearum
Tuberculina maxima
Tuberculina ovalispora
Tuberculina pallida
Tuberculina pamparum
Tuberculina paraguayensis
Tuberculina pelargonii
Tuberculina persicina
Tuberculina phacidioides
Tuberculina phyllachoricola
Tuberculina pirottae
Tuberculina portulacarum
Tuberculina praeandina
Tuberculina prosopidicola
Tuberculina ricini
Tuberculina rosae
Tuberculina sbrozzii
Tuberculina solanicola
Tuberculina solanina
Tuberculina talini
Tuberculina tweediana
Tuberculina umbrina
Tuberculina vinosa
Tuberculina viridis

External links

Basidiomycota genera
Helicobasidiales